Mustafa Yavuz (born 13 April 1994) is an Austrian footballer who plays as a midfielder for FCM Traiskirchen.

Personal life
Yavuz is of Turkish descent.

References

External links

 

Austrian footballers
Austrian people of Turkish descent
Austrian Football Bundesliga players
2. Liga (Austria) players
Austrian Regionalliga players
FK Austria Wien players
1. Simmeringer SC players
FC Admira Wacker Mödling players
SC Wiener Neustadt players
1994 births
Living people
Association football defenders
Association football midfielders